Lasmigona is a genus of freshwater mussels, aquatic bivalve mollusks in the family Unionidae.

Species within the genus Lasmigona

 Lasmigona alabamensis (Alabama heelsplitter)
 Lasmigona complanata (white heelsplitter): Found in the Midwest United States in Illinois, Indiana, Wisconsin, and Michigan. 
 Lasmigona compressa (creek heelsplitter)
 Lasmigona costata (flutedshell)
 Lasmigona decorata (Carolina heelsplitter)
 Lasmigona etowaensis (Etowah heelsplitter)
 Lasmigona holstonia (Tennessee heelsplitter)
 Lasmigona subviridis (green floater)

References

 
Bivalve genera
Taxonomy articles created by Polbot